

Netherlands
 Edwin van Ankeren – Guingamp – 2000–01
 Bram Appel – Reims – 1949–54
 Beb Bakhuys – Metz – 1937–39
 Mitchel Bakker – Paris SG – 2019–21
Mitchell van Bergen – Reims – 2021–
 Marco Bizot – Brest – 2021–
 Myron Boadu – Monaco – 2021–
 Ilan Boccara – Evian – 2013–14
 Hendrick den Boer – FC Nancy – 1950–51
 Piet den Boer – Bordeaux, Caen – 1989–91
 Branco van den Boomen – Toulouse – 2022–
 Peter Bosz – Toulon – 1988–91
 Sven Botman – Lille –  2020–22
 Joek Petrus Brandes – Nîmes Olympique, Montpellier – 1950–51, 1952–53
 Albertus Carlier – Strasbourg, AS Monaco – 1954–55, 1958–64
 Thijs Dallinga – Toulouse – 2022–
 Memphis Depay – Lyon – 2016–21
 Dick van Dijk – Nice – 1972–74
 Javairô Dilrosun – Bordeaux – 2021–22
 Lee-Roy Echteld – Cannes – 1997–98
 Anwar El Ghazi – Lille –  2017–18
 Edwin Gorter – Caen – 1991–93
 Heinz van Haaren – Strasbourg – 1972–73
 Said Hamulic – Toulouse – 2022–
 Lambertus de Harder – Bordeaux – 1949–54, 1955–56
 Cor van der Hart – Lille – 1950–55
 Jos van Herpen – Brest – 1989–91
 Cas Janssens – Nîmes Olympique – 1973–74
 Jerry de Jong – Caen – 1994–95
 Wim Kieft – Bordeaux – 1990–91
 Ricardo Kishna – Lille – 2016–17
 Kees Kist – Paris SG – 1982–83
 Jan Klijnjan – Sochaux – 1973–77
 Justin Kluivert – Nice – 2021–22
 Patrick Kluivert – Lille – 2007–08
Terence Kongolo – Monaco – 2017–18
Adick Koot – Cannes – 1991–92, 1993–98
Cees van Kooten – Lille – 1971–72
Jan de Kubber – Bordeaux – 1950–56
Tscheu La Ling – Marseille – 1984–85
Rajiv van La Parra – Caen – 2008–09
John Lammers – Toulon – 1988–90
Wilhelm van Lent – Lille, Lens – 1949–50, 1951–54
Willem Letemahulu – Brest – 1979–80
Azor Matusiwa – Reims – 2021–
Mario Melchiot – Rennes – 2006–07
Stanley Menzo – Bordeaux – 1997
Kiki Musampa – Bordeaux – 1997–99
Arnold Oosterveer – Rennes, Valenciennes – 1990–93
Tarik Oulida – Sedan – 2002–03
Patrick Paauwe – Valenciennes – 2006–07
Erik Pieters – Amiens – 2018–19
Jan Poortvliet – Cannes – 1988–89
Karim Rekik – Marseille – 2015–17
Johnny Rep – Bastia, Saint-Étienne – 1977–83
Petrus van Rhijn – Valenciennes, Stade Français – 1956–58, 1959–60
Wim Rijsbergen – Bastia – 1978–79
Kees Rijvers – Saint-Étienne, Stade Français – 1950–54, 1955–57, 1960–62
Johannes Rohrig – CO Roubaix-Tourcoing – 1952–53
Pablo Rosario – Nice – 2021–
Philippe Sandler – Troyes – 2021–22
Marinus Schapp – RC Paris – 1952–53
Kaj Sierhuis – Reims – 2019–
Sonny Silooy – RC Paris – 1988–89
Xavi Simons – Paris SG – 2020–22
Wesley Sneijder – OGC Nice – 2017–18
Stijn Spierings – Toulouse – 2022–
Piet Steenbergen – Le Havre – 1950–51
Maarten Stekelenburg – Monaco – 2014–15
Calvin Stengs – Nice – 2021–
Joop Stoffelen – RC Paris – 1950–51
Kevin Strootman – Marseille – 2018–21
Wim Suurbier – Metz – 1978–79
Theodorus Suurendonk – AS Monaco – 1971–72
Wilbert Suvrijn – Montpellier HSC – 1989–93
Kenny Tete – Lyon – 2017–20
Theodorus Timmermans – Nîmes Olympique – 1950–53
Gerald Vanenburg – Cannes – 1997–98
Lambert Verdonk – Marseille, Ajaccio – 1971–73
Frank Verlaat – Auxerre – 1992–95
Arjan Vermeulen – Nice – 1996–97
Pierre Vermeulen – Paris SG – 1985–87
Henk Vos – Metz, Sochaux – 1990–91, 1993–95
Arie de Vroet – Le Havre – 1950–52
Gregory van der Wiel – Paris SG – 2012–16
Georginio Wijnaldum – Paris SG – 2021–
Richard Witschge – Bordeaux – 1993–94, 1995–96
Rob Witschge – Saint-Étienne – 1989–90
Ricky van Wolfswinkel – Saint-Étienne – 2014–15
Boudewijn Zenden – Marseille – 2007–09

New Caledonia
Georges Gope-Fenepej – Troyes, Amiens – 2012–13, 2017–18
Wesley Lautoa – Lorient, Dijon 2011–21

New Zealand
 Bill Tuiloma – Marseille – 2014–15

Niger
Seybou Koita – Amiens – 2017–18
Hervé Lybohy – Nîmes – 2018–19
Moussa Maâzou – AS Monaco, Bordeaux – 2009–11

Nigeria
 Olubayo Adefemi – Boulogne – 2009–10
 Rabiu Afolabi – Sochaux – 2005–09
 Victor Agali – Marseille, Nice – 1996–97, 2004–05
 Uche Agbo – Montpellier – 1997–98
 Onyekachi Apam – Nice – 2006–10
 Chidozie Awaziem – Nantes – 2017–18
 Tosin Dosunmu – Nancy – 2006–07
 Elderson Echiéjilé – Rennes, AS Monaco – 2007–09, 2014–16
 Edorisi Ekhosuehi – Le Mans – 2005–06
 Joseph Enakarhire – Bordeaux – 2006–07
 Vincent Enyeama – Lille – 2013–18
 Lukman Haruna – AS Monaco – 2008–10
 Brown Ideye – Sochaux – 2009–11
 Victor Ikpeba – AS Monaco – 1993–99
 Bonke Innocent – Lorient – 2021–
 Sani Kaita – AS Monaco – 2008–09
Samuel Kalu – Bordeaux – 2018–22
 Stephen Keshi – Strasbourg – 1992–93
 Josh Maja – Bordeaux – 2018–22
 Terem Moffi – Lorient, Nice – 2020–
 Dickson Nwakaeme – Angers – 2016–17
 Peter Odemwingie – Lille – 2005–07
 Bartholomew Ogbeche – Paris SG, Bastia, Metz – 2001–05
 Jay-Jay Okocha – Paris SG – 1998–02
 Godwin Okpara – Strasbourg, Paris SG – 1996–2001
 Egutu Oliseh – AS Nancy – 1998–2000
 Henry Onyekuru – Monaco – 2019–21
 Wilson Oruma – Lens, AS Nancy, Sochaux, Marseille – 1994–98, 2002–08
 Victor Osimhen – Lille – 2019–20
 Richard Daddy Owobokiri – Laval, Metz – 1986–89
 Nduka Ozokwo – Nice – 2008–09
 Samson Siasia – Nantes – 1993–95
 Moses Simon – Nantes – 2019–
 Taye Taiwo – Marseille – 2004–11
 Kalu Uche – Bordeaux – 2004–05
 John Utaka – RC Lens, Rennes – 2002–07
 Ejike Uzoenyi – Rennes – 2012–13
 Taribo West – Auxerre – 1993–97
 Joseph Yobo – Marseille – 2001–02
 Simon Zenke – Strasbourg – 2007–08

North Macedonia
 Kiril Dojčinovski – Troyes – 1974–76
 Sokrat Mojsov – Rennes – 1971–73
 Spasoje Nikolić – RC Paris, Rennes – 1946–49, 1951–53
 Robert Popov – Auxerre – 2008–10
 Vlatko Stojanovski – Nîmes – 2019–21
 Gjoko Zajkov—Rennes – 2014–15

Northern Ireland
 Phil Gray – AS Nancy – 1996–97
 Michael Hughes – Strasbourg – 1992–95
 George O'Boyle – Bordeaux – 1988–89

Norway
 Haitam Aleesami – Amiens – 2019–20
 Willy Andresen – Stade Français – 1951
 Patrick Berg – Lens – 2021–22
 Daniel Braaten – Toulouse FC – 2008–13
 John Carew – Lyon – 2005–07
 Dan Eggen – Le Mans – 2003–04
 Hassan El Fakiri – AS Monaco – 2002–05
 Per Figved – Sochaux – 1950–51
 Geir Frigård – Sedan – 1999–2000
 Ruben Gabrielsen – Toulouse FC – 2019–20
 Stian Gregersen – Bordeaux – 2021–22
 Thorstein Helstad – Le Mans – 2008–10
 Noah Holm – Reims – 2022–
 Warren Kamanzi – Toulouse FC – 2022–
 Anders Konradsen – Rennes – 2012–15
 Bjørn Tore Kvarme – Saint-Étienne, Bastia – 1999–2001, 2004–05
 Birger Meling – Nîmes, Rennes – 2020–
 Georg Monsen – FC Nancy – 1950
 Thøger Nordbø – Club Français – 1932–33
 Ousman Nyan – Ajaccio – 2002–03
 Hans Nylund – RC Paris – 1959–60
 Arne Larsen Økland – RC Paris – 1984–85
 Inge Cecil Paulsen – Sochaux – 1950
 Harald Pettersen – Sochaux – 1938–39
 Kjetil Rekdal – Rennes – 1996–97
 John Arne Riise – AS Monaco – 1998–01
 Ole Selnæs – Saint-Étienne – 2016–19
 Alexander Søderlund – Saint-Étienne – 2015–18
 Gunnar Stensland – FC Nancy – 1949–50
 Fredrik Strømstad – Le Mans – 2008–10
 Alexander Tettey – Rennes – 2009–12
 Torgeir Torgersen – Stade Français – 1950–51

References and notes

Books

Club pages
AJ Auxerre former players
AJ Auxerre former players
Girondins de Bordeaux former players
Girondins de Bordeaux former players
Les ex-Tangos (joueurs), Stade Lavallois former players
Olympique Lyonnais former players
Olympique de Marseille former players
FC Metz former players
AS Monaco FC former players
Ils ont porté les couleurs de la Paillade... Montpellier HSC Former players
AS Nancy former players
FC Nantes former players
Paris SG former players
Red Star Former players
Red Star former players
Stade de Reims former players
Stade Rennais former players
CO Roubaix-Tourcoing former players
AS Saint-Étienne former players
Sporting Toulon Var former players

Others

stat2foot
footballenfrance
French Clubs' Players in European Cups 1955-1995, RSSSF
Finnish players abroad, RSSSF
Italian players abroad, RSSSF
Romanians who played in foreign championships
Swiss players in France, RSSSF
EURO 2008 CONNECTIONS: FRANCE, Stephen Byrne Bristol Rovers official site

Notes

France
 
Association football player non-biographical articles